The GAZ-55 was a Soviet military ambulance developed in the 1930s by Gorkovsky Avtomobilny Zavod (GAZ) and was used by the USSR during the Second World War. It was based on the GAZ-AA model. With only 9130 models ever being produced, the Red Army still relied heavily on standard trucks to transport their wounded. Production of this ambulance reportedly continued until 1946.

One GAZ-55 was captured by a unit of the Luftwaffe.

In popular culture
The GAZ-55 is featured in the 1941 Russian film 'Frontovye podrugi' (The Girl from Leningrad).

In video games
The GAZ-55 is featured in the video game 'Red Orchestra 2: Heroes of Stalingrad'.

Gallery

References 

GAZ Group trucks
Military ambulances
World War II vehicles of the Soviet Union
Military vehicles introduced in the 1930s